The Shadow Secretary of State for Health and Social Care is an office within British politics held by a member of His Majesty's Loyal Opposition. The duty of the office holder is to scrutinise the actions of the government's Secretary of State for Health and Social Care and develop alternative policies. The office holder is a member of the Shadow Cabinet and appointed by the Leader of the Opposition. It is currently held by Wes Streeting

List of Shadow Secretaries of State for Health

References

Official Opposition (United Kingdom)